Notes is a notetaking app developed by Apple Inc. It is provided on their iOS, iPadOS and macOS operating systems, the latter starting with OS X Mountain Lion. It functions as a service for making short text notes, which can be synchronized between devices using Apple's iCloud service. The application uses a similar interface on iOS and macOS, with a non-textured paper background for notes and light yellow icons, suggesting pencil or crayon. Until 2013, both applications used a strongly skeuomorphic interface, with a lined, textured paper design; the Mountain Lion version placed this inside a leather folder. This design was replaced in OS X Mavericks and iOS 7.

iOS/iPadOS version

iOS 9

iOS 10 
In iOS 10, Notes now has a collaboration feature for many people to work on a note at the same time.

iOS 11 
The update to Notes released with iOS 11 adds tables, pinned notes, a document scanner, graph and lined paper, monospaced text support, handwriting search and improved integration with Apple Pencil. Tapping the Pencil on the Lock screen will bring up a new note, with drawing active; the Pencil can also be used while in the Notes app to start an inline drawing.

iOS/iPadOS 15 
Notes supports using tags, which is a efficient way to categorize notes.

macOS version 
Prior to Mountain Lion, Apple Mail on macOS supported a mailbox containing notes, which was synced with notes in the Notes application in iOS. This situation was a kludge: as Apple Mail already implemented the IMAP mailbox synchronization protocol, it could also sync imal additional work. In Mountain Lion, notes were moved to a separate Notes application. Created notes are synced through all the user's Apple devices through the iCloud service. Notes can be arranged in folders and pinned to the user's desktop. When the application is closed, the pinned note still remains. Additionally, unlike the iPad, iPhone, and iPod touch versions, the OS X Mountain Lion Notes application allows for images to be embedded within notes. Originally, notes could be created in three different default fonts, Noteworthy, Marker Felt, and Helvetica. Users could also add custom fonts by visiting the "Show Fonts" menu. The menu allows users to change text size, and format lists, choose the alignment (left, center, justify, or right), assign a writing direction, and indent text. Attachments, images, and hyperlinks can also be added to a note. Attachments cannot be viewed on iOS devices.

Data Storage Opacity and Exporting Issues

Due to the proprietary nature of the data storage mechanism for the Apple Notes app(s), users of this software may be locked into it without a convenient way to export all Notes data to a different format. While Apple does provide a way to export individual notes as PDF files, the software does not provide a mechanism to export the text of all notes to a text file, a Rich Text File, or other commonly-used data file formats as a bulk data transfer.

OS X El Capitan 
As of OS X El Capitan, Notes received a significant functional overhaul (in-line with the iOS 9 version), with major features including: iCloud sync, the ability to view sketches created on the iOS counterpart, advanced text formatting options, several styles of lists, rich web and map link previews, support for more file type attachments, a corresponding dedicated attachment browser and a system share extension point for saving web links, images, etc. As of OS X El Capitan 4, individual notes can be password-protected, with the password syncing across compatible devices.

macOS High Sierra 
The update to Notes released with macOS High Sierra adds tables.

In popular culture 
Social media users have often used the Notes application to write short notes which can then be posted as a screenshot to social media sites such as Instagram or Twitter. Writers have noted that this form of communication has often been used by celebrities to make public statements, perhaps to give them an informal feel or extend beyond platform character limits, including often to post public apologies.

See also
 Evernote – independent, cross-platform note-taking service, allowing storage of more complex data such as tables, charts, and pictures
 Microsoft OneNote – Microsoft's cross-platform note system, linked to a Microsoft account
 Reminders – Apple's reminder service, also using iCloud
 Google Keep – Google's note-taking application, available on Android and iOS as a web application
 Windows Notepad
 Notebook

External links 
 Use Notes on your iPhone, iPad, and iPod touch on support.apple.com

References

 IOS software
MacOS text-related software
 IOS-based software made by Apple Inc.
 Note-taking software